is the 7th and final installment of the Jewelpet anime franchise created by Sanrio and Sega and animated by Studio DEEN. It was first announced by Sanrio in the 2015 Winter Wonder Festival in Japan and was confirmed in the March Issue of the Shogakukan magazine Pucchigumi. The series aired on April 4, 2015 on TV Tokyo and TV Osaka and is directed by Nobuhiro Kondo and written by Masahiro Yokotani. It is the first Jewelpet installment to be officially handled by Studio DEEN.

The series revolves around Airi Kirara, a 14-year-old junior high student who encounters a Jewelpet named Ruby which she becomes friends with. During that time, a strange castle has fallen from the sky into her town without warning, causing confusion to arise about where this castle came from. People have come in to investigate, but the castle is inaccessible to humans. Now being called the Jewel Castle, people have never known the castle is of otherworldly origin, as Jewel Land's magic fades, the castle appears in the human world due to mankind's fading belief in magic. In order to strengthen its magic once more, Jewelpets are sent all across the Human World in order to study their way of life and in hopes that their helping hand could rekindle their "magic-believing hearts". Years later, Airi is now living with and her older brother and her new Jewelpet friends ever since after the Jewel Castle had fallen to their town. But during an incident, Airi and Ruby discovers some strange new powers together that can help them. Together, Airi and the Jewelpets much help each other to solve mysteries and also find a way to bring the castle back to Jewel Land.

Hajime Hyakkoku of Fukai Music Factory composed the music for the series. The opening song is titled  by Magical☆Dreaming, a group composed of members of Dorothy Little Happy, GEM and X21. The first ending theme is titled Tell me tell me!! by Dorothy Little Happy while the second is titled Baby, Love me! by GEM and the third titled Magical☆Kiss (マジカル☆キス Majikaru☆Kisu?) by X21.

Episode list

References

General
 http://www.tv-tokyo.co.jp/anime/jewelpet7/index2.html

Specific

Magical Change